Mystique (Raven Darkhölme) is a fictional character appearing in American comic books published by Marvel Comics, commonly in association with the X-Men. Created by artist David Cockrum and writer Chris Claremont, she first appeared in the comic book Ms. Marvel #16 (April 1978).

A member of a subspecies of humanity known as mutants who are born with superhuman abilities, she is a shapeshifter who can mimic the appearance and voice of any person with exquisite precision; her natural appearance includes blue skin, red hair and yellow eyes. Typically portrayed as a foe of the X-Men, Mystique has been both a supervillain and an antiheroine, founding her own Brotherhood of Mutants and assassinating several important people involved in mutant affairs; she has been stated to be over 100 years old. Mystique is the mother of the X-Men hero Nightcrawler and the villain Graydon Creed, and the adoptive mother of the X-Men heroine Rogue.

Mystique has been described as one of Marvel's most notable and powerful female antiheroes.

Mystique appears in seven of the 20th Century Fox X-Men films: the character was portrayed by Rebecca Romijn in X-Men (2000), X2 (2003) and X-Men: The Last Stand (2006), while Jennifer Lawrence portrayed a younger version in X-Men: First Class (2011), X-Men: Days of Future Past (2014), X-Men: Apocalypse (2016) and Dark Phoenix (2019).

Publication history
Mystique was created by David Cockrum. Chris Claremont saw Cockrum's design, dubbed the character "Mystique", and, with Cockrum's permission, set her in Ms. Marvel #16 (May 1978). The character's true appearance was revealed in Ms. Marvel #18 (June 1978) and first cover appearance in The Avengers Annual #10 (1981).

Claremont, a former X-Men writer, has said that he originally intended Mystique and Destiny to be Nightcrawler's biological parents (with Mystique having morphed into a male body for the act of conception), but Marvel didn't agree, because at that time the Comics Code Authority prohibited the explicit portrayal of gay or bisexual characters.

Fictional character biography

Mystique's origins remain unknown - her shapeshifting powers mean that her true age remains enigmatic, and her gender identity may be equally fluid. Her earliest attested appearance dates back to the years around 1900, when she lived in a male guise as a "consulting detective" who established a romantic relationship with the her reality's version of Irene Adler - biographical details which imply she is in fact Sherlock Holmes.

Sabretooth

While in her Raven persona, Mystique adopts the identity of deceased German secret agent Leni Zauber. Both Leni and Victor Creed, a.k.a. Sabretooth, had been assigned with the assassination of a scientist in East Berlin. Mystique completes the mission in place of Leni, and then she and Victor have to hide in a safe location for a while. They become lovers, but she soon fakes her death to leave him.

The result of this short-lived affair is reportedly the birth of Graydon Creed. A number of stories report that soon after his birth, Mystique gives him up for adoption. Others depict Mystique making arrangements for him from a distance. Raven keeps track of his activities until he reaches adolescence. Despite being the child of two mutants, Graydon is not a mutant himself. Mystique is disappointed and soon abandons him. Graydon grows to hate his parents, and eventually extends his hatred to all mutants. He becomes leader of the mutant-hating organization Friends of Humanity, and then a politician. At the height of his political ascension, Graydon is assassinated by an unknown shooter. The shooter is later revealed to be a time traveling version of Mystique as part of a convoluted time paradox involving Jean Grey, Iceman, Toad, and Juggernaut.

Nightcrawler
Still masquerading as Raven, Mystique is married to Baron Christian Wagner; older sources give his name as Count Eric Wagner, an affluent German noble. He proves to be a loving husband, but disappointing as a lover. His infertility adds to their marital problems. Mystique starts using her shapeshifting powers to secretly have sexual encounters with others. She is eventually seduced by fellow mutant Azazel. Azazel states that he is ruler of "an island nation off the coast of Bermuda: La Isla des Demonas", The Island of Demons. He is later revealed to be immortal and the father of an ancient race of mutants known as the Neyaphem, active since at least 2000 BC.

Mystique becomes pregnant, but her husband becomes suspicious and his own father suggests a blood test to verify whether the child is his. Mystique uses a dagger to murder him and then buries him. She gives birth to a baby with black hair, yellow eyes, blue skin, and a pointed tail. The locals consider the mother and child to be demons and attempt to kill them. Mystique escapes but abandons her son. He is found and raised by Roma sorceress Margali Szardos and named Kurt Wagner.

Rogue
Mystique becomes the adoptive mother of the fourteen-year-old girl Rogue. Rogue had run away from her home in rural Caldecott County, Mississippi. The girl was living alone in a wooded area, brandishing a shotgun and trusting no one, when Mystique found her. Destiny foresees that Rogue will be important to them and Mystique seeks her out, gains her trust, and takes her in. She and Destiny raise the girl, and Mystique grows to be very protective of her.

Mystique, as Raven Darkhölme, rises rapidly through the United States Civil Service to the trusted position of Deputy Director of the Defense Advanced Research Projects Agency (DARPA) in the United States Department of Defense. This position gives her access to military secrets and advanced weaponry, both of which she uses for her own criminal and subversive purposes. In this position, she attempts the theft of the Centurion weaponry from S.H.I.E.L.D. As Destiny had predicted that Ms. Marvel was a danger to Rogue, she spied on Carol Danvers and Ms. Marvel for some time prior to beating her lover Michael Barnett to death, and sought to kill Ms. Marvel.

To help her in her criminal activities, Mystique organizes her own incarnation of the Brotherhood of Evil Mutants, consisting of herself, Avalanche, the Blob, Destiny, and Pyro. The Brotherhood attempts to assassinate Senator Robert Kelly, a notoriously anti-mutant politician. The X-Men thwart the assassination attempt, and all of the Brotherhood except Mystique herself are incarcerated.

Rogue is trained by Mystique and eventually joins the Brotherhood of Evil Mutants. Her mutant power is the ability to absorb the memories, personality, and skills or powers of whomever she touches. To free the other members of the Brotherhood, Mystique concocts a plan involving Rogue absorbing the powers of Ms. Marvel and the Avengers. Though the plan is successful, the Avengers ultimately defeat the Brotherhood of Evil Mutants, capturing all of them except Rogue and Mystique. Moreover, Rogue finds that she has absorbed Ms. Marvel's memories, personality, and powers permanently. In a further humiliation, a confrontation at the Pentagon ends with Mystique being defeated and turned over to the authorities by a powerless Ms. Marvel.

The Brotherhood of Evil Mutants eventually escape, and battle against Dazzler. In an act of revenge against Mystique, Mastermind unbalances Rogue's psyche with the one she absorbed from Ms. Marvel, which prompts her to defect to the X-Men. Because Rogue left without a word, Mystique assumes that Professor X, the X-Men's mentor, brainwashed her. The Brotherhood of Evil Mutants accordingly launches an attempt to kill Professor X. Rogue stops Mystique, and explains that she joined the X-Men because Professor X, as the world's most powerful telepath, is her best hope of healing for her fragmented psyche. Mystique reluctantly relinquishes her guardianship of Rogue.

Freedom Force
Anti-mutant sentiment rises and the federal government launches its own covert anti-mutant program, Project Wideawake. Believing that the times have become too dangerous for the Brotherhood of Evil Mutants to continue, Mystique goes to Doctor Valerie Cooper, special assistant to the head of the National Security Council, and offers the Brotherhood's services to the government. In return for entering government service, Mystique and her team receive a presidential pardon for all criminal charges, to be revoked if any member of Freedom Force is found committing a crime. Cooper agrees to convey the offer to the President on the condition that the Brotherhood arrests their founder, Magneto. The Brotherhood, now reincarnated as Freedom Force, are defeated by Magneto and the X-Men. When Magneto learns that Freedom Force are official federal agents, he voluntarily surrenders to them.

Mystique leads Freedom Force in capturing the Avengers on behalf of the federal government. She clashes with X-Factor in seeking to arrest Rusty Collins. With Freedom Force, she fights the X-Men in Dallas, and witnesses her foster daughter's apparent demise. With Freedom Force, she battles Cyclops and Marvel Girl. With Freedom Force she seeks to arrest Rusty Collins again, and battles the New Mutants. She finally succeeds in capturing Collins as well as Skids. She leads Freedom Force against the Reavers on Muir Island. On this particularly disastrous mission, Freedom Force loses two of its members, Stonewall and Mystique's lover Destiny. The death of her lover leaves Mystique psychologically scarred.

Mystique is later nearly killed by Dr. Valerie Cooper, who is under the Shadow King's mental control. She then impersonates Dr. Valerie Cooper. Mystique is eventually discovered impersonating Dr. Cooper, and saves Xavier's life by killing the Shadow King's human host, Jacob Reisz. She finally reconciles with Rogue. In time, she comes to terms with Destiny's death. She teams with Spiral and Wolverine in thwarting Mojo's near-destruction of the universe. Mystique later briefly stays as a guest at Xavier's mansion. She begins going insane, and leaves the mansion under the care of Forge.

X-Factor
Mystique resurfaces several months later, in a failed attempt to kill Legion for his murdering of Destiny. Mystique has an implant put in her skull by Forge in order for the government to be able to keep track of her. She is then forced to become a member of the government-sponsored team X-Factor after being arrested for trying to blow up a dam. In truth, Mystique had been trying to save the dam, which the U.S. Government wanted to destroy so that they could blame it on mutants. Her membership leads to tension with her teammates when Sabretooth is added to the team months later as a sleeper agent, for the main purpose of killing Mystique before she can uncover the truth about the conspiracy. She slowly develops a romantic relationship with team-leader Forge (though he later thought that she was just using him).

Part of the conspiracy involves Mystique's son Graydon Creed running for President, under an anti-mutant platform.

At the same time, both Graydon and Mystique learn that Destiny married and had children during one of the couple's separations. Destiny/Irene's children are now adults with their own children, one of which is a mutant. Graydon has the mutant teen savagely beaten by members of the Friends of Humanity, as a warning towards his mother. Mystique is furious and wants to kill her son, but stops when she is given a message that Graydon's backers want her to kill him and turn her son into a martyr.

Mystique then seeks to save her son from being betrayed by his backers, but fails. Graydon's death ushers in a new wave of anti-mutant violence. Sabretooth acts on his orders to kill the members of X-Factor as "Operation Zero Tolerance" is activated. Mystique distracts Sabretooth long enough to keep him from finishing off the team. Mystique then flees the scene after arranging for X-Factor to receive medical treatment for the wounds Sabretooth inflicted.

Mystique goes into hiding, taking the identity of the senator's wife Mallory Brickman, using her husband's influence to set the FBI on Sabretooth. She prevents Rogue from giving up her mutant powers and continues her investigation of the U.S. Government over her son's death, leading to her aiding Toad and his most recent incarnation of the Brotherhood of Mutants on a mission to raid a government base. The mission fails thanks to Machine Man, who fights the Brotherhood and forces the team to flee. Mystique flees to Europe. While taking the form of a blonde haired woman, Mystique is confronted by a famous photographer who proposes to make her a big fashion model.

Amused, Mystique accepts and quickly becomes the fashion industry's newest top model. Using her money, Mystique moves back to New York and into an expensive penthouse apartment. There, Skrulls staying in a nearby building frame Mystique for the murder of a Japanese diplomat. With help from Shadowcat and Rogue, Mystique is cleared and leaves town. Before she leaves, Shadowcat finds one of Destiny's diaries, left there by Destiny herself before she died.

Breakdown
While gaining critical intelligence on the identity of those who were involved in her son's death and the attempt to kill her using Sabretooth, Mystique suddenly loses her powers while pretending to be a man in a busy office workplace.

Mystique is arrested. The U.S. Government acts on their intelligence regarding Mystique, and destroys all of the alternate identities that she established over the years and confiscate the money she and Destiny had hidden away. The loss of her powers and her freedom causes her to lash out at everyone around her. Rogue has no sympathy for Mystique's plight. The relationship sours when Rogue refuses to tell Mystique that the X-Men are going to fight the High Evolutionary, who was responsible for depowering all mutants, to restore everyone's powers. The X-Men defeat the High Evolutionary and restore everyone's powers, allowing Mystique to escape jail.

Mystique is sent back in time by the original X-Factor's sentient ship. Raven finds that she is destined to be part of a great time paradox, where she finds herself with a time delay weapon, which she is about to program to kill Graydon. After some deliberation, she decides to activate the weapon to kill Graydon. Mystique's sanity is further damaged by the revelation that Destiny was one of the founding members of the anti-mutant conspiracy Mystique had dedicated countless years to fighting, and had willfully withheld medical treatment to mutant children that would have resulted in them not growing up deformed due to their mutations.

This leads to Raven again going mad. She reforms the Brotherhood of Evil Mutants for another assassination attempt on Senator Kelly, and kidnaps Moira MacTaggert and impersonates her to access her research on the Legacy Virus. Mystique uses samples of the Legacy Virus to create a biological weapon that would infect humans and not mutants, and develops a cure for the Legacy Virus.

The assassination attempt on Kelly ends in failure when Pyro betrays his teammates. Mystique blows up MacTaggert's research facility, fatally injuring the doctor. Mystique then shoots Moira's foster daughter Wolfsbane with a prototype of Forge's neutralizer gun, depowering her. The X-Men confront Mystique and she is seriously wounded. She tells the X-Men that Destiny had predicted a dark future for mutant-kind, and that the future Destiny foretold kept on unfolding despite all that Mystique had done to prevent it. She believes that the only way to save them is to eradicate all humans.

Mystique is sent to prison, but quickly escapes. She allies herself with Martinique Jason in an attempt to wrest control of the X-Corps from its founder, Banshee. Outfitted with a device that gives her the ability to generate an electrical charge, Mystique creates the identity of a supervillain named Surge and joins the X-Corps. While Jason mind-controls the other members of the organization, Mystique brings Banshee's organization down and slits his throat, leaving him in critical condition.

Double agent
Professor X is forced to make Mystique his secret agent, as his previous one, Prudence Leighton, has died and Mystique is the only one suitable to complete the missions. Xavier poses as Magneto to rescue Mystique from the Department of Homeland Security and from execution at the hands of Johny Kitano, Special Magistrate for Homo Superior crimes against humanity, and a mutant himself. At this time, Mystique claims that there is an imposter out to frame her, taking control over the Brotherhood and sending them on their recent missions (the assassination of Moira and the infiltration of X-Corps). As long as Mystique completes the missions without killing anybody, Xavier, working with Forge, keeps her safe from the authorities, who are out to execute her.

One of Xavier's enemies, the Quiet Man, who is actually Prudence Leighton inhabiting the body of her assassin, contacts Mystique and offers to give her an interference transmitter which would keep her safe from the authorities if she kills Xavier. Creating a plan that would free her from both men, Mystique pretends to try killing Xavier while secretly working with the mutant thief Fantomex, after alerting Forge to stop her at the last moment. Her plan is to have the Quiet Man see this and believe that she really has attempted to kill Xavier and is still working for him. The other X-Men believe that Mystique has tried killing Xavier and seek her out.

Rogue tracks her down. Distraught with rage, she attacks her foster mother. Mystique escapes by blowing up the house and going through the window, changing her form to shield her fall.

Mystique goes to the Quiet Man, who is planning on having her killed. After a battle, Mystique kills the Quiet Man, saves her former field-handler Shortpack, and discovers the Quiet Man's interference transmitter was a fake. She tries to steal Forge's interference transmitter but is caught. After some angry words, he smashes it and tells her he never wants to see her again. The two share a sad goodbye kiss and Mystique leaves. After Mystique is gone, Forge realizes that she had already switched his transmitter for the fake one.

Joining the X-Men
Mystique later infiltrates the X-Men, posing as a young girl named Foxx and joining Gambit's training squad, the Chevaliers. She attempts to seduce Rogue's boyfriend Gambit to break them up so she can set her daughter up with a young mutant named Augustus, but Gambit resists. Mystique ultimately reveals herself to him, telling him that she is trying to relieve the tension between him and Rogue (because of the two being unable to touch due to her ability to absorb someone's essence upon skin-to-skin contact). Mystique then metamorphoses into Rogue and tells Gambit that he would not be cheating on Rogue if he had sex with her in Rogue's form.

When the telepath Emma Frost discovers who Foxx really is, the X-Men confront Mystique. Mystique tells them that she had been lonely and wants to join the X-Men. Mystique uses Rogue's doubts about what happened between her and Gambit to sow further discord in Rogue's relationship with Gambit, but he still refuses. The X-Men vote and decide to have Mystique join them on a probationary status (though Rogue is one of the ones who vote against her joining). Nightcrawler asks her to leave for a while regardless of the vote, saying that he needs more time adjusting to the idea of her being a member. Mystique agrees and leaves. After M-Day, she joins the X-Men and brings Augustus (Pulse) along with her. Both have been crucial in the downfall of Apocalypse.

Marauders
After the Hecatomb battle on Providence, Rogue's team returns to Rogue's childhood home in Caldecott County, Mississippi, which Mystique owns, for some downtime. Mystique alerts the X-Men, who come to treat Rogue's illness, that there are intruders in the area. Only after Lady Mastermind drops her illusions do the X-Men realize that it is an all-out attack, and that both Lady Mastermind and Omega Sentinel (the latter being possessed by Malice) have defected sides. During the Marauders' initial ambush, Mystique prevents Scalphunter from shooting Rogue. She then reveals herself as a traitor as well, shoots her adopted daughter, and orders the remaining Marauders to kill the X-Men.

Mystique remains with the Marauders during the hunt for the first new mutant baby, but is revealed to have murdered Mister Sinister in a plot involving the baby and Rogue's killing touch. She also appears to be working with Gambit, who, like her, has ulterior motives to want to betray Mister Sinister. When Sinister approaches Mystique as she is with the comatose Rogue, Mystique shoves Sinister onto Rogue, killing him through fatal skin-to-skin contact. Then, in keeping with the words of the Destiny Diaries, she touches the baby's face to Rogue's. The baby's touch purges her of the Strain 88 virus and all the residual psyches she had absorbed over her life, including Hecatomb. Rogue is sickened by Mystique's manipulations, and leaves.

Wolverine tracks Mystique to the Middle East and then into Afghanistan. It is hinted at that Mystique's recent betrayal is not the only reason Logan is out to kill her, as they have a common history of friendship, love, and ultimately, betrayal. After a heated fight, Wolverine wounds Mystique, but denies her the Coup de grâce.

Manifest Destiny
Mystique shows up again, posing as Bobby Drake's ex-girlfriend Opal Tanaka. She sets off a bomb inside of Bobby's Blackbird before shooting him and kicking him out of the plane. Later, she follows Iceman to the hospital and injects him with a fatal dose of a toxin created by Mister Sinister. Hospital staff try to get to Iceman, but they are held back by Mystique while Iceman expels the toxin from his system. Afterward, Mystique attacks Iceman in a truck and sets the truck ablaze with Iceman in it. Iceman steps out of the fire unharmed and disarms and immobilizes Mystique, but she escapes after turning her body into her child form. Mystique impersonates Iceman and stands on top of the Golden Gate bridge threatening to blow it up. Iceman arrives and discovers the reason for Mystique doing this is Wolverine telling her that she will die alone. After a heated conversation, Iceman freezes the bomb. Mystique jumps off the bridge into the water. Iceman tells Cyclops and Hank McCoy that he knows that she is not dead and thanks her for what she did for him.

Dark X-Men
Mystique joins Norman Osborn's Dark X-Men, posing as Professor Charles Xavier for P.R. purposes. Osborn has her injected with nanites and kept on a short leash; should she try anything, Osborn would turn her into a human bomb. After the defection of Emma Frost, Namor, and Cloak and Dagger, Mystique leads the remaining members of the team under the public guise of Jean Grey, as no one could prove Jean had actually died, but mainly to hurt those who had caused her great harm.

Wolverine, having returned from hell and retrieved his possessed body from a demonic force, targets Mystique after finding out she was responsible for sending his soul there at the behest of The Red Right Hand. Mystique is shot by a hit-man named Lord Deathstrike. Badly wounded, Mystique patches herself and escapes on a motorcycle. Wolverine and Lord Deathstrike are in hot pursuit of Mystique throughout the San Francisco streets simultaneously. Mystique ultimately confronts Wolverine, who stabs her with his claws, killing her. Lord Deathstrike collects Mystique's body and auctions it off. Her corpse is sold for 5 million to group of ninjas. It is implied these are agents of The Hand.

Revival
Mystique is seen alive again posing as Sabretooth at Los Angeles International Airport. In the form of Sabretooth she has agreed to assist the Hellfire Club in their destruction of the Jean Grey School. Mystique, as Sabretooth, was a faculty member of The Hellfire Academy. When the Hand revived Mystique, her powers were enhanced and she is now capable of changing her scent to match the forms she takes.

Receiving word that the original X-Men are in the present day, Mystique seeks out young Scott Summers to manipulate him into thinking she has his and mutantkind's best interests at heart. She uses Lady Mastermind and Sabretooth to commit robberies and frame the X-Men. Viper shows up. Mystique explains to her that she wants to buy Madripoor from HYDRA and control the crime in the area. Before this transaction is completed, the X-Men raid the place. Lady Mastermind and Mystique are captured, but Mystique escapes in a S.H.I.E.L.D. helicopter.

Mystique is attacked by Iceman, who is possessed by the Apocalypse fragment. After Iceman is shattered into pieces by Thor, Mystique takes the Apocalypse fragment and swallows it to inherit its powers.

To help move her plans along, Mystique drugs and replaces Dazzler, who's now became SHIELD's mutant liaison, allowing her to set up her New Brotherhood under Maria Hill's nose. She sets up operations in Madripoor, allowing her to regularly visit to 'investigate' the mutant uprising there, while secretly being the one in charge of it. She offers Magneto a place in her New Brotherhood after he leaves the Uncanny X-Men team, but he rejects it on the grounds of her financing her operation via drug money from Mutant Growth Hormone sales, attacking and defeating her Brotherhood and stealing her chopper to find his own place in the new world.

Uncanny Avengers
Mystique appears as a member of Magneto's unnamed supervillain group during the fight against Red Skull's Red Onslaught form. When the heroes and villains present undergo a moral inversion due to a flawed spell cast by the Scarlet Witch and Doctor Doom, Mystique joins the other inverted villains in the 'Astonishing Avengers' as they go up against the inverted X-Men and Avengers, also working to prevent the inverted Nightcrawler from killing those who were involved in the riot that nearly killed him before his first meeting with Professor X. During the final fight, Mystique briefly poses as Professor X to try to get through to the 'reborn' Apocalypse (Actually the now-adult clone of Apocalypse known as Evan Sabahnur that the X-Men had been trying to raise away from his template's influence), but is converted back to her usual villainous attitude at the conclusion of the storyline.

Krakoan Era
Mystique is sent in with a team of X-Men to stop the launch by the anti-mutant Orchis organization to activate Mother Mold, an incredibly powerful Master Mold made to make other Master Molds that will lead to the Nimrod generation. While they succeed, the whole team is killed in the raid, to then be resurrected on Krakoa.

Mystique is sent on a last-ditch mission to detonate a singularity bomb inside the Orchis base before Orchis leader Dr. Alia Gregor completes her own Nimrod prototype, in exchange for moving the resurrection of Destiny to the front. The mission ends in failure, with only the Nimrod containing Alia's husband's mind being destroyed. A back-up Nimrod is nevertheless still functioning. This leads to Magneto and Professor X forbidding Destiny's resurrection—it is heavily implied they had no intention of ever doing this due to her being a threat to Moira McTaggert—and Mystique remembering a promise Destiny made to burn down Krakoa if such an event occurred.

Powers and abilities
Mystique is a mutant shapeshifter with the ability to molecularly shift the formation of her biological cells at will to change her appearance and thereby assume the form of other humans and animals. She can also alter her voice to duplicate exactly that of another person. Originally, it was clearly stated that Mystique's powers were limited to appearances only; she could not assume the powers of the people she morphed into or alter her body to adapt to different situations. Additionally she could not change her overall body mass when taking on the appearance of a person larger or smaller, but due to subsequent enhancements she has stated that her body mass is not fixed and can change when she does.

Her body is not limited to purely organic appearances: She also has the ability to create the appearance of clothes and other materials out of her own body, including items such as glasses, zippers, identity cards, handbags and even test tubes. Mystique is shown in at least one instance transforming a metallic part of her costume into a functioning blaster pistol. Whether this is a function of her powers or the costume piece itself, is unclear.

As a shape-shifter, Mystique is able to constantly alter and rejuvenate her body's cells and thereby retain her youthful appearance despite having lived for over one hundred years.

Mystique received her first power enhancement in the X-Men Forever miniseries, in which she was exposed to dangerous levels of radiation to save the life of Toad. The process boosted her powers so that she can now morph her body into taking certain desired physical traits depending on her situation at the time. Examples of these new abilities include night vision, wings on her back, talons in her fingers or toes, and natural body armor. She can compress into nearly two-dimensions (like a sheet of paper) to glide on air currents in a fashion similar to that of Mister Fantastic. She has moved her vital organs out of place to survive gunshots to her torso and head,<ref>Wolverine vol. 2 #304</ref> and can make herself virtually invisible via camouflage. She has even, with strain, given herself two heads and four arms to facilitate a gun fight on two fronts, as well as shapeshifted into herself as a small child. She is also now able to hold a shape when knocked unconscious and can conceal items in shapeshifted pouches under her skin.

Following her death and resurrection by the Hand, her powers have been further enhanced. She can now alter and conceal her scent from those with enhanced senses, and is capable of changing her shape to a greater degree, including altering her limbs to form tentacles and bladed weapons, and compressing herself into a dog.

Damage to her biological tissue is known to heal at a relatively fast rate and she can form a resistance to poisons upon contacting them. Her enhancements have allowed her to rapidly regrow severed limbs, and rapidly recover from near fatal injury. Her powers grant her immunity to diseases, enhanced agility and strength, and agelessness.

Mystique is a cunning strategist in terrorist and commando operations, and adept at martial arts and information technology. She has a talent for finding, stealing, and understanding cutting edge weaponry. She is a talented actress and a polyglot, being fluent in over fourteen languages. Her mind is naturally unreadable owing to changing grey matter and she wears devices to prevent telepathic intrusion. Furthermore, with over a century's experience in posing as other people she has picked up the unusual skill of being able to identify people posing as others based on body language and changes in behavioral cues.

Having lived for at least a century, Mystique has built up considerable resources, one of her aliases being the billionaire B Byron Biggs who owns a number of safehouses around the world which are often protected by sophisticated security systems. She also controls a variety of weaponry and gadgets, including the Changeling, a highly advanced stealth ship capable of cloaking and flying at very high speed. The ship had sophisticated weapons and surveillance systems, with an on-board analysis computer and power-suppressing containment cells.

 Legacy 

 Critical reception 
Shoshana Kessock of Tor.com called Mystique "one of the most impactful mutant villains in the comics," writing, "With several independent movies suggested for the ongoing X-Men franchise, we’ll just have to wait and see if our favorite blue shapeshifter appears beside Gambit and Magneto as a possibility. Fox would really be losing out if they overlooked their opportunity for a kick-ass, sexy, heartfelt and powerful action movie with Mystique." Peter Eckhardt of CBR.com stated, "The shape-shifting Mystique is one of the X-Men's most compelling characters. Mystique is primarily motivated by self-interest and is capable enough to get what she wants, be it through espionage, combat, or manipulation. One of the most dynamic figures in the Marvel Universe, Mystique has remained a central player since her introduction." Richard Chachiwski of Screen Rant wrote, "One of the most recognizable villains in all of X-Men comics, Mystique is a blue-skinned, red-haired mutant shapeshifter able to take any physical form she wishes. A frequent adversary to the X-Men, she has also been portrayed as an unlikely anti-heroine in later years. The founding member of her own Brotherhood of Mutants, Mystique is characterized not only by her memorable physical appearance, but also by the various personal relationships she maintains with several X-Men team members." IGN asserted, "Not every great villain has to be a world-conquering, war-mongering, super-powered bad ass. Some of them are simply great at manipulating events to their liking, bending the world to their desire and getting away with it. Mystique is one of those villains, and is absolutely one of the greatest female villains ever created. [...] In essence, over the years X-fans have been treated to a kick ass femme fatale who has found herself at several key turning points in the history of the mutant race. Princess Weekes of The Mary Sue said, "One of my biggest issues with the X-Men film franchise is how they have underserved their actresses/female characters. Despite Mystique being known for her pragmatism, spy-craft, intelligence, queerness, and complex family history, all of that, in adaptation, gets chiseled down to spy-craft and that’s it. The character has a lot more to offer audiences, and considering we, as comic fans, have been denied the entire majesty of Mystique, and how amazing Romijn was in delivering the very basic bones and elevating it to a masterclass, with writers who care, she could be the amazing antagonist we deserve." Evan Valentine of Comicbook.com stated, "Marvel's Mystique is about to play a major role in Marvel's comics with the upcoming comic book event, Inferno, acting as one of the biggest story arcs of Jonathan Hickman's X-Men run. While no one knows when the Marvel Cinematic Universe will introduce the blue-skinned villain to its roster, she was definitely a fan-favorite mutant within Fox's X-Men titles."

 Sexuality 
Benjamin Riley of Special Broadcasting Service referred to Mystique as one of the "queer superheroes who changed the face of comics," writing, "You could argue that shapeshifting, femme-fatale Mystique's bisexuality makes her another negative example of the 'bisexual villain' trope in popular culture, but given she's one of comics' most interesting superhero characters I think she pulls it off. Brutally intelligent and morally opaque, Raven Darkholme has a prominent X-Men villain, and occasional ally, for decades. Her co-creator Chris Claremont has said Mystique was always meant to have been in a romantic, same-sex relationship with her long-time partner Destiny, but Marvel Comics' then-edict on same-sex romance meant this had to be revealed in hindsight, years after Destiny's character had been killed off." Matthew Kang of MovieWeb described Mystique an "allegory for the LGBTQ+ experience," saying, "Some mutants choose to hide that they are a mutant. Others publicly embrace that aspect of themselves. While the Marvel universe is not the most welcoming towards mutants, Raven Darkholme (Mystique) chooses to accept herself and declares that she is "mutant and proud." In the real world, allies and members of the LGBTQ+ community wave the rainbow flag. June is Pride Month, a time when people celebrate the freedom to be themselves." Samantha Puc of Newsarama called Mystique and Destiny's relationship one of the "most iconic LGBTQIA+ comics romances," writing, "Though it remains to be seen whether it's a good thing or a bad thing, longtime villains-turned-Krakoan politicians Mystique and Destiny are mutantkind's current power couple, following Destiny's resurrection and their upending of the Quiet Council's status quo in the recent Inferno limited series. And they've certainly earned their place as mutant matriarchs." Sara Century of Syfy said, "Mystique has been a hypersexualized seducer of men in many of her comic book appearances since Destiny’s death, and while that isn’t inherently a bad thing, it has a tendency to distract writers and readers away from other interesting aspects of her character. Her stories have distanced her from the discussion of her queerness and her potential status as a non-binary character so much as to render it non-existent. Mystique has seldom been given the deeper focus she deserves, even after years of stories in which she appeared as a prominent character. Her relationship with Destiny is still referred to in the context of close friendship in most stories." Mark Young of BuzzFeed wrote, "The shapeshifting mutant not only has a strong history of being with any and all people, she also defies gender on a daily basis. Her onscreen portrayals have been very straight and as a sort of lackey/underling figure, but her comic history shows the queer woman has very much been her own amazing figure." Beat Staff of ComicsBeat stated, "Mystique and Destiny have been written as lovers from the beginning. From their first appearances, the love and loyalty they felt for each other was so palpable that it has to date inspired fanfiction and critical commentary that takes their status as one of comics’ most epic love stories as text. Wherever their story might go, Mystique and Destiny have always had the kind of love that transcends the thoughts, desires, and expectations of the outside world." Jude Dry of IndieWire asserted, "While she’s only been depicted in her many movie appearances as being interested in men such as Charles Xavier or Magneto, Mystique has been canonically bisexual since 1981. The character has been romantically connected to her companion Destiny ever since their first appearance in X-Men together. The characters are shown dancing together, and the ancient power known as the Shadow King refers to Destiny as Mystique’s “leman,” an archaic term for “lover.” The antiquated word was likely a ruse to slip past the comic sensors of the time. Mystique is one of the most famous and beloved X-Men, and making her bisexual would certainly be a boon for the MCU."

 Accolades 

 In 2009, IGN ranked Mystique 18th in their "Greatest Comic Book Villain of All Time" list and included her in their "Marvel's Femme Fatales" list.
 In 2014, BuzzFeed ranked Mystique 20th in their "95 X-Men Members Ranked From Worst To Best" list.
 In 2015, Entertainment Weekly ranked Mystique 14th in their "Let's rank every X-Man ever" list.
 In 2019, Screen Rant ranked Mystique 9th in their "10 Strongest Female Marvel Villains" list.
 In 2019, CBR.com ranked Mystique 9th in their "X-Men: The 10 Most Powerful Female Villains" list.
 In 2020, Scary Mommy included Mystique in their "195+ Marvel Female Characters Are Truly Heroic" list.
 In 2021, BuzzFeed ranked Mystique 9th in their "11 Of The Most Important Marvel And DC LGBTQ+ Superheroes" list.
 In 2022, Screen Rant ranked Mystique 3rd in their "10 Best X-Men Characters Created By Chris Claremont" list.
 In 2022, CBR.com ranked Mystique 3rd in their "Marvel's 10 Best Infiltrators" list, 4th in their "10 Most Heroic Marvel Villains" list, and ranked Mystique and Destiny's 5th in their "Marvel's 10 Best Married Couples" list. 
 In 2022, The A.V. Club ranked Mystique 11th in their "28 best Marvel villain" list and 62nd in their "100 best Marvel characters" list. 
 In 2022, Newsarama ranked Mystique 10th in their "Best X-Men villains" list.

 Literary reception 

 Volumes 

 Mystique - 2003 
According to Diamond Comic Distributors, Mystique #1 was the 25th best selling comic book in April 2003.

 X-Men: Black - Mystique - 2018 
According to Diamond Comic Distributors, X-Men: Black - Mystique #1 was the 42th best selling comic book in October 2018.  X-Men: Black - Mystique #1 was the 400th best selling comic book in 2018.

Mike Fugere of CBR.com described X-Men: Black - Mystique #1 as a"great villain spotlight," writing, "Other than that one quibble, from a narrative standpoint the issue is fun and gives a strong voice to Raven. Her inner monologue reads like a character screed written for new readers, telling you everything you need to know about Mystique while still keeping everyone at arm’s length, which plays to the character's strengths brilliantly. If Mystique were to get her own miniseries, or even an ongoing series, we would love to see McGuire take the reins. She has a wonderful understanding of the character, and conveys this fact in a single issue. The artwork is solid as well. Marco Failla (Ms. Marvel) is a talent to watch. His panel layout and story beat transitions are smooth and easy to follow (which makes those pesky character tags even more frustrating), and his line work is crisp and reminds us of the works of Oscar Bazaldua. And while the coloring in this issue isn't exactly next level, Jesus Aburtov brings enough to the table to keep things aesthetically pleasing. Next to the Mojo issue, this is the best offering from X-Men: Black so far. It's fast-paced and leaves you wanting more of Mystique, and reminds us that Raven is more than just Jennifer Lawrence in blue makeup. Mystique is a powerhouse of a character, one who, when in the right hands, can drive noir and espionage narratives with ease. Just like the previous entries in X-Men: Black this is one to add to your stack if you have even the slightest interest in the character." Peyton Hinckle of ComicsVerse gave X-Men: Black - Mystique #1 a score of 91%, saying, "In X-Men: Black - Mystique #1, McGuire finally gives Mystique some definitive titles that go beyond “villain” or “X-Man.” We see her not just as a thief but as someone who truly feels as though stealing and committing crimes is a form of art. Her ease and calm demeanor show us a master at work. Her willingness to release the young captured mutant shows what may be the beginning of morals. Of course, the senseless slaughter of an entire office building full of people shows us the exact opposite. Mystique doesn’t learn some grand lesson or show true emotion, like in Magneto and Mojo’s X-MEN BLACK issues. But, someone who’s been around for as long as Mystique has doesn’t need those things. She just needs the things that make her who she is. [...] X-Men: Black - Mystique #1 is the kind of issue that is undoubtedly a good read but definitely could have said more. A few hints about Mystique’s future could have gone a long way and would’ve given readers something to look forward to. Still, I thoroughly enjoyed learning more about Mystique’s personal motives and identity. If you’re not a fan of Mystique, this issue probably isn’t for you, since it’s absolutely focused on her character. If you are a fan, or perhaps used to be a fan, this one is definitely worth a buy."

Other versions

Absorbed by Rogue
A copy of Mystique's mind, including her memories and personality, exists within the mind of Rogue ever since the events of "X-Men: Messiah Complex". She converses with Rogue. She also requests that Rogue turn over control of their body. Eventually she is erased by Professor Xavier.

Age of Apocalypse
In the Age of Apocalypse timeline, she gave up her adopted daughter Rogue to Magneto and his X-Men. Years later, Mystique is the ferrywoman to Avalon. It is her task to meet the refugees and make sure they meet the guide to Avalon, Cain. Though she works against Apocalypse, she is not much of a hero. She charges a heavy tariff to ferry the refugees to Avalon, taking all of their valuables. This plagues her conscience and she is reluctant to go to Avalon, as she feels that she is not fit to enter. Ultimately, she gets past her guilt to guide her son, Nightcrawler, to Avalon and find Destiny. She and her son form X-Calibre to defeat Apocalypse's agents, the Pale Riders and the Shadow King.

Battle of the Atom
Mystique's future is shown, where she is revealed to be the mother of Charlie Xavier II, the son of Charles Xavier, possessing his father's powers and appearance. While disguised as Moira MacTaggert she gives birth to Charlie, but upon birth she tearfully abandons her child. Later she raised her son Raze (conceived by Wolverine, with his mother's shape-shifting skills and his father's healing ability), who eventually killed her and took her appearance to rule Madripoor.

Cable's Future
Mystique inquires of Cable "How does [history] judge the part we play here and now in protecting the remnants of mutant-kind?" He says "History is short on specifics" and that it only remembers broad movements, not individuals. She hints at wanting to know how she is remembered, and he comments that her name did survive in a database of his time. Her name is synonymous with traitor, comparing her name to Judas Iscariot. He adds that the information from his time is part of his history, as it was 2,000 years old.

Earth-14412
A Mystique from Earth-14412 first appears in the form of unidentified woman in a dark robe and golden skin. In addition, she possesses the powers of her reality's Phoenix Force and operates as the Dark Phoenix. She is a member of the Multiversal Masters of Evil and is in charge of the Berserkers consisting of Hound (a version of Wolverine from an alternate reality) and an unidentified version of Thor. Dark Phoenix and Hound accompanied King Killmonger in attacking Echo's Phoenix form, Iron Man, and Thor in Asgard where Dark Phoenix summoned her Thor to her side. After briefly engaging Echo, Dark Phoenix, Hound, and King Killmonger retreated after Dark Phoenix's Thor was killed by Thor. They alongside the rest of the Multiversal Masters of Evil left Earth-616 to get back to work.

On one Earth that she rules, the Dark Phoenix kills any flying animal that comes her way so that she would be the only one that flies. The Hellfire Church that works for her have their slaves collect the dead flying animals.

Dark Phoenix and Hound were with the Multiversal Masters of Evil when they take over another Earth before they can return to Earth-616. Just then, Ghost Rider arrives to fight them. After using the Hell Charger to knock down Hound and Kid Thanos, Ghost Rider chains up Dark Phoenix and has the Hell Charger drag it. By the time Ant-Man of Earth-818 and Ghost Rider's Deathlok companion arrive where the former shrinks Doom Supreme, Dark Phoenix goes on the attack. Deathlok buys Ant-Man of Earth-818 time to get away as Dark Phoenix manages to kill him. After the Hell Charger leaves with Ghost Rider and Ant-Man of Earth-818, Dark Phoenix states that she is starting to hate that car. Doom Supreme tells Dark Phoenix and the rest of the Multiversal Masters of Evil that they need to regroup as he knows where they are going. They will make one more stop before they can return to Earth-616 as Doom Supreme states that "No Avenger gets out alive".

Dark Phoenix and Hound accompany the Multiversal Masters of Evil in fighting the Avengers and the Prehistoric Avengers where Hound is killed by Prehistoric Ghost Rider. After being repelled where most of her teammates are either dead or defeated, Dark Phoenix returns to her Mystique form and goes to find Doom Supreme where she accuses him of abandoning them when they were getting their butts kicked. She ended up attacking a hologram of Doom Supreme. In a flashback, it was shown that Mystique took on the powers of the Phoenix Force and blasted apart Old Man Phoenix.

Exiles

In the Earth-797 reality, Mystique is apparently a man and goes by the name of Raphael-Raven Darkhölme (and his alias is Mystiq). Much like the main Mystique, he has a relationship with Destiny but due to his gender has a child with her (Claremont's original plan for Nightcrawler's origin). They are both killed in unknown circumstances and Raphael often goes to their grave sites. On such an occasion, he is about to be attacked by soldiers when the Exiles' Sabretooth, who had been stranded on this Earth, saves his life. Saying he is in his debt, he joins the Exiles when they come to pick up their teammate.

House of M
In the House of M, Mystique is an agent of S.H.I.E.L.D. and a member of its elite unit, the Red Guard, alongside Jessica Drew, Toad, and her children Rogue and Nightcrawler. She's also involved in an affair with Wolverine, the Red Guard's leader. When this unit, in pursuit of their former leader, attacks the heroes 'awakened' by Layla Miller, the entire squad is restored. With all of reality against them, any personal history is set aside, and Mystique fights alongside the rest of the 'awakened' without incident.

Infinity Wars
During the Infinity Wars storyline where the universe was folded in half, Mystique was fused with Lady Deathstrike creating Deathstrique. She was hired by Dragon King (fusion between Shadow King and Dragoness) to assassinate Diamond Patch (fusion between Wolverine and Emma Frost), but was instead slashed and thrown from the roof by Diamond Patch.

She was then hired by Red Dormmamu (fusion of Red Skull and Dormammu) to masquerade as Madame Hel (fusion between Madame Masque and Hela) and start a conflict between Soldier Supreme (fusion between Captain America and Doctor Strange) and Iron Hammer (fusion between Thor and Iron Man).

Marvel Mangaverse
In X-Men Mangaverse, Mystique teams up with Nightcrawler and other Brotherhood members. Storm later kills her with a lightning bolt.

Marvel Zombies
Mystique appears as a zombie twice in the Marvel Zombies universe. She is first shown disguised as Scarlet Witch to get close to and bite Quicksilver, thus becoming directly responsible for the fast spread of the zombie virus throughout the world. She is also shown fighting alongside zombie versions of Avalanche, Blob, and Pyro taking a direct blast from Cyclops right to the face.

Ultimate Marvel
In the Ultimate Marvel Universe, Mystique is the former lover of Charles Xavier. During their stay in the Savage Land with Magneto, the young Emma Frost comes under the tutelage of Xavier, and shortly thereafter he dumps Mystique for Frost. Ever since then, Mystique has held great resentment toward Xavier, which in turn makes her loyal to Magneto. She teams up with Forge and helps Magneto escape the Triskelion by taking his place in the prison cell, before she is replaced by Mastermind and Stacy X and given a new assignment. She is hinted to be one of the few who actually knows how Xavier's darker side operates, stating "We all bought into Xavier's dream until we got a look at the sick brain behind it." It is later revealed that Emma Frost named Xavier's cat after Mystique, after the feline partially destroyed the decor of his office. She briefly appears in Ultimates 3, impersonating the Black Widow to distract Tony Stark until knocked out by the Wasp. She is later seen with the few surviving Brotherhood members still stationed in Wundagore.

X-Men: The End
In the trilogy book series X-Men: The End Mystique is posing as Dark Beast and pretending to work with Mister Sinister. When Sinister murders Rogue she kills him. Gambit later asks her to look after his and Rogue's children when he goes off into space.

X-Men Fairy Tales
Mystique appears briefly in the X-Men Fairy Tales limited series' first issue. She is leading a group of thieves who attack the old monk/Professor X. They are scared away by Hitome/Cyclops. The other thieves are Avalanche and Pyro. In the fourth issue, she appears as Anna/Rogue's mother, a voodoo priestess.

In other media

Television
 Mystique was a recurring character in the 1990s X-Men animated series, voiced by Randall Carpenter (seasons one and two), and by Jennifer Dale (subsequent appearances). This version was the Brotherhood of Mutants' leader and a close ally of Apocalypse (who in this version gave her powers and adopted the identity of a mutant cure doctor to lure into servitude), Mister Sinister and Magneto. She is also the birth mother of Graydon Creed Jr., Nightcrawler (Kurt Wagner) and the adoptive mother of Rogue, whom she's been trying to return her to her villainous ways.
 Mystique plays a prominent role in X-Men: Evolution, primarily voiced by Colleen Wheeler. The birth mother of Nightcrawler (Kurt Wagner) and the adoptive mother of Rogue, this version is an initial follower of Magneto throughout season one as she was disguised as Principal of Bayville. She is featured sparingly in subsequent seasons while disguising herself as Risty Wilde (voiced by Nicole Oliver) for a majority of this time before being turned into a Horseman of Apocalypse in the series finale. 
 Mystique appears in Wolverine and the X-Men, voiced by Tamara Bernier. This version is an Acolyte of Magneto and has a romantic history with Wolverine.
 Mystique is featured in The Super Hero Squad Show, voiced by Lena Headey. In the episode "Deadly is the Black Widow's Bite", she poses as Black Widow to gain the Super Hero Squad's trust.
 Mystique appears in Marvel Disk Wars: The Avengers, voiced by Masumi Asano.

 X-Men film franchise 

 Rebecca Romijn played Mystique in the 2000 film X-Men. She is a member of Magneto's Brotherhood of Mutants alongside Sabretooth and Toad. 
 Romijn reprises the role in the 2003 sequel X2; Bruce Davison played an impersonation of Senator Robert Kelly. She frees Magneto from the plastic cell in which Magneto was being held, and together the two help the X-Men infiltrate William Stryker's base at Alkali Lake to stop Stryker's plan of Professor X brainwashed in a duplicate Cerebro to kill all mutants.
 Romijn reprises her role in 2006's X-Men: The Last Stand. Magneto and Pyro free her along with Juggernaut and the Multiple Man from a moving prison van. When she dives in front of a series of shots meant for Magneto, the mutant cure within the ammunition turns her into a normal human, and Magneto abandons her as she's no longer a mutant. Traumatized and betrayed by the experience, Mystique goes to the FBI and gives the location of Magneto's base of operations.
 Jennifer Lawrence portrays a younger version of the character in the 2011 prequel X-Men: First Class; Morgan Lily briefly plays a child depiction while Romijn makes a cameo as a transformation of seduction. She is raised as Charles Xavier's foster sister, and helps found the X-Men, but eventually defects to Erik Lensherr's side as she's dissatisfied with Xavier's constant attempts to ask her to hide where Magneto encouraged her not to fear her true appearance. 
 Lawrence reprises her role in the 2014 film X-Men: Days of Future Past. It was her assassination of Bolivar Trask that leads to the latter's martyrdom, resulting in the Sentinel program's fruition. Mystique was subsequently captured and experimented upon, leading to the Sentinels' unstoppable shapeshifting abilities and a dystopian future. The film revolves around Wolverine's attempts to stop her assassination of Trask and avert the dark future after being sent back in time by Kitty Pryde projecting Wolverine into a younger self. The group stops Mystique's attempt to kill Trask, but the altercation exposes mutants to the world for the first time earlier than in the previous timeline, prompting President Richard Nixon to approve the Sentinel program while Trask studies a blood sample Mystique left behind during the attack. When Trask Industries uses the Sentinels to Washington, D.C. for a national presentation which Magneto secretly surrounded in steel to control and subsequently commandeers the Sentinels to attack the crowd, Mystique (disguised as Nixon) was in the middle of the confusion. When Hank McCoy's mutation gets suppressed with a serum to which a Sentinel turns on Magneto, the distraction allows Mystique to shoot with a plastic gun, wounding Magneto and releasing the Sentinels' control. After Xavier convinces Mystique to let Trask live, the world sees that a mutant saved the President and the Sentinel program is shut down. Trask is arrested for selling military secrets to foreign powers, erasing the dystopian future seen earlier in the film. Mystique remains rogue, but disguises herself as William Stryker to save Wolverine from drowning in the Potomac River.
 Lawrence reprised her role in the 2016 film X-Men: Apocalypse. The film is set in the 1980s, with Mystique now the 'public face' of the idea of heroic mutants, and not aligned with Magneto as she did in the original timeline after the last film's events. Despite being idolized by other mutants as a hero, she rejects the notion while focusing simply on getting the oppressed to safety. Younger mutants like Ororo Munroe, Scott Summers, and Jean Grey see her as an inspiration, and some have begun trying to use their powers for heroics or vigilantism based on her examples. After she sees a news report about the death of Magneto's family while she is trying to help Nightcrawler, she has Nightcrawler take her back to Xavier's mansion so that Xavier can help her find Magneto. In the process, she unintentionally alerts the powerful new foe Apocalypse to their existence, prompting Xavier's abduction. After briefly being held captive by Stryker, Raven and the other adults are rescued by Scott, Jean, and Nightcrawler, prompting Raven to accompany them on the mission to rescue Xavier from Apocalypse and convincing Erik, who joined Apocalypse to get revenge on humanity after his wife and daughter were killed by cops, she and Quicksilver, Erik's unknown son, succeeds to make realize Erik that he still has a family and he, repented for his actions, helps them to defeat Apocalypse and becomes a true hero despite kindly refusing a place in the X-Mansion as a teacher. At the film's conclusion, Mystique returns to the X-Men as one of Xavier's lieutenants (along with Beast) and field commander while Quicksilver chooses to tell Erik about their relationship at the opportune moment.
 Lawrence reprised her role for the final time in the 2019 film Dark Phoenix. In the film, Raven begins to voice her frustrations to Xavier for sending the X-Men on increasingly dangerous missions and leaving her to save them, and even suggests that the name of the team be changed to the "X-Women", a line that was widely criticized by fans and critics alike. During a confrontation with Jean as the Phoenix, Mystique attempts to talk her down, only to have her friend lose control and accidentally impale her on a broken piece of wood. Mystique's death profoundly affects both Beast and Magneto, who briefly work together to try to kill Jean in retaliation.

Video games
 In the X-Men arcade game, she appears, first disguised as Professor X between stages 5 and 6. She is the boss of stage 7, Asteroid M, where she takes Magneto's form; she attacks players with punches and kicks curiously more quickly than the real Magneto.
 Mystique appears in the 2000 fighting game, X-Men: Mutant Academy, and its 2001 sequel, X-Men: Mutant Academy 2, as a playable character.
 Mystique is a playable character in X-Men: Next Dimension, voiced by Julianne Grossman. In the game she does not utilize her shapeshifting abilities, relying instead on her martial arts skills and weaponry.
 Mystique appears as a boss in X-Men Legends, voiced by Grey DeLisle.
 Mystique appears as an NPC X-Men Legends II: Rise of Apocalypse, voiced again by Grey DeLisle. In a mission that takes place in the Savage Land where the players look for Destiny, Mystique helps the players fight Garokk. She has special dialogue with Rogue.
 Mystique appears in 2009's movie tie-in X-Men Origins: Wolverine, voiced by Anna Graves. She masquerades as a CIA operative working with Major William Stryker's Team X.
 Mystique appears in the Nintendo DS version of the Marvel Super Hero Squad video game.
 Mystique appears as a villain character in Marvel Super Hero Squad Online.
 Mystique appears in X-Men: Destiny, voiced by Sumalee Montano.
 Mystique is available as downloadable content for the game LittleBigPlanet, as part of "Marvel Costume Kit 1".
 Mystique appears in Lego Marvel Super Heroes, voiced by Laura Bailey.
 Mystique is playable in the mobile game Marvel Strike Force.
 Mystique appears as an NPC in Marvel Ultimate Alliance 3: The Black Order, voiced again by Sumalee Montano. She accompanies Magneto and Juggernaut in attacking the X-Mansion to claim the Infinity Gem that Beast stole from the Hellfire Club. Following Juggernaut's rampage in the X-Mansion, Mystique trapped the heroes in the Danger Room while posing as Cyclops. She got briefly incapacitated when the Danger Room overloaded. During Corvus Glaive and Proxima Midnight's attack on the heroes and Magneto, Mystique assumed the form of Proxima Midnight to stab Corvus Glaive only to be knocked out afterwards by the real Proxima Midnight.
 Mystique is available as a playable character in Fortnite Battle Royale Chapter 2, Season 4, which has been titled "Nexus War".
 Mystique appears in the digital collectible card game Marvel Snap.

Collected editions
 Essential Ms. Marvel Vol.1 (Ms. Marvel Vol.1 #1-23; The Avengers Vol.1 Annual #10; Marvel Super-Heroes #10-11; 512 pages, February 2007)
 Mystique Vol.1: Dead Drop Gorgeous (Mystique #1-6; 160 pages, August 2004)
 Mystique Vol.2: Tinker, Tailor, Mutant, Spy (Mystique #7-13; 170 pages, November 2004)
 Mystique Vol.3: Unnatural (Mystique #14-18; 120 pages, January 2005)
 Mystique Vol.4: Quiet (Mystique #19-24; 150 pages, April 2005)
 Mystique By Brian K. Vaughan Ultimate Collection (Mystique #1-13; 312 pages, May 2011)
 Mystique By Sean McKeever Ultimate Collection (Mystique #14-24; 256 pages, June 2011)
 Wolverine: Get Mystique'' (Wolverine Vol.3 #62-65; 96 pages, August 2008)

References

External links
 Mystique at Marvel.com
 Mystique at UncannyXMen.net

Villains in animated television series
Characters created by Chris Claremont
Characters created by Dave Cockrum
Comics about women
Comics characters introduced in 1978
Female characters in animation
Female characters in film
Female characters in television
Female film villains
Fictional actors
Fictional assassins in comics
Fictional bisexual females
Fictional characters with superhuman durability or invulnerability
Fictional female assassins
Fictional impostors
Fictional mercenaries in comics
Fictional models
Fictional murderers
Fictional people from the 19th-century
Fictional private investigators
Fictional secret agents and spies
Fictional women soldiers and warriors
Marvel Comics characters who are shapeshifters
Marvel Comics characters with accelerated healing
Marvel Comics female superheroes
Marvel Comics female supervillains
Marvel Comics film characters
Marvel Comics LGBT superheroes
Marvel Comics LGBT supervillains
Marvel Comics martial artists
Marvel Comics mutants
Supervillains with their own comic book titles
X-Factor (comics)
X-Men supporting characters